Giuseppe "Peppiniello" Di Capua (born 15 March 1958) is an Italian competition rowing coxswain and Olympic champion.

Biography
Di Capua was born in Salerno. He received a gold medal in coxed pairs as cox, with Giuseppe Abbagnale and Carmine Abbagnale, at the 1984 Summer Olympics in Los Angeles, and again at the 1988 Summer Olympics in Seoul. The crew won silver medals at  the 1992 Summer Olympics in Barcelona behind another pair of brothers, Greg and Jonny Searle.  In 2013 he won a silver medal at the World Rowing Championships in Chungju, Korea, coxing the Italian LTA mixed coxed four, and in 2014 a bronze in the same event at the World Championships in Amsterdam.

References

External links
 

1958 births
Living people
Italian male rowers
Olympic rowers of Italy
Olympic gold medalists for Italy
Rowers at the 1980 Summer Olympics
Rowers at the 1984 Summer Olympics
Rowers at the 1988 Summer Olympics
Rowers at the 1992 Summer Olympics
Olympic medalists in rowing
Coxswains (rowing)
People from Salerno
Medalists at the 1992 Summer Olympics
Medalists at the 1988 Summer Olympics
Medalists at the 1984 Summer Olympics
Olympic silver medalists for Italy
World Rowing Championships medalists for Italy
Sportspeople from the Province of Salerno
20th-century Italian people